Sciarra is an Italian surname. Notable people with the surname include:

Girolamo Colonna di Sciarra (1708–1763), Italian Roman Catholic Cardinal of the noble Colonna di Sciarra family
Prospero Colonna di Sciarra (1707–1765), Italian Roman Catholic cardinal of the family of the dukes of Carbognano

Daniele Sciarra (born 1991), Italian footballer
Emiliano Sciarra (born 1971), Italian game designer
John Sciarra (born 1954), American football player
John Sciarra, Jr., American football player
Laurent Sciarra (born 1973), French basketball player
Mark Sciarra (born 1954), American retired professional wrestler, known as Rip Rogers
Maurizio Sciarra (born 1955), Italian film director
Paul Sciarra, American Internet entrepreneur
Silvana Sciarra (born 1948), Italian judge

 In fiction
Lucia Sciarra, fictional character of the 2015 British spy film Spectre

See also
Sciarra Colonna (1270–1329), Italian member of the powerful Colonna family
Villa Sciarra (Rome), property of the Italian noble family Colonna di Sciarra from 1811 until 1880s

Italian-language surnames

it:Sciarra